The La Crosse Loggers are a La Crosse, Wisconsin based baseball team playing in the Northwoods League, a collegiate summer baseball league. Since the team's inaugural season in 2003, they have played at Copeland Park. The ballpark is nicknamed "the Lumberyard."

The team is owned by Dan Kapanke, a former Wisconsin State Senator. 

The Loggers are one of 22 teams in the Northwoods League, playing 72 games per season, from late May through mid-August. The Northwoods League is a summer collegiate league that provides an opportunity for college players to spend their summers and display their talents to professional scouts. Players must be enrolled in college and have at least one year of athletic eligibility to participate. The league is designed to give college players the minor league experience, providing players an opportunity to play under the same conditions using wooden bats and minor league specification baseballs, experiencing overnight road trips, and playing nightly before fans in a stadium.

Notable alumni
Riley Adams (2015), C 
Scott Alexander (2008), LHP
Vic Black (2007), RHP
Rob Brantly (2009), C
Trevor Brown (2011), C
Matt Chapman (2012), 3B
Daniel Ray Herrera (2005), LHP
Brett Jackson (2007), OF
Andrew Knapp (2011), C
Kevin Kramer (2012), IF
Brooks Kriske (2013)
Mike Marjama (2010), C
Seth Mejias-Brean (2010)
Andrew McKirahan (2009), LHP
Lars Nootbaar (2016), OF
Jordan Pacheco (2005), IF/C
Tim Peterson (2011), RHP
Chris Sale (2008), LHP
Max Scherzer (2004), RHP
Tyler Smith (2011), IF
Eric Thames (2007), OF/1B
David Villar (2017)
Steve Wilkerson (2011), 3B
Rowan Wick (2011), RHP

References

External links
La Crosse Loggers website

Northwoods League teams
Sports in La Crosse, Wisconsin
Amateur baseball teams in Wisconsin